Henry de Bolleghe (also Thomas and de Bolley) was Archdeacon of Totnes during 1275.

References

Archdeacons of Totnes
13th-century English people
13th-century English clergy